Khalid Abbas Dar (born 1945 ) is an actor, playwright, director, theatre producer, entertainer, mimic, one-man show and a television host in Pakistan. In a career spanning over five decades, Dar has established himself as one of the greatest entertainers in the Indian Subcontinent.

Life time achievement award from radio Pakistan 2022  . 

Best PTV entertainer award 1987 .

Role of honour 1966

Awarded by Govt college Lahore.

Personal life 
He was born into the family of Abdul Malik Dar, director sports at the Islamia College, who was vehemently opposed to his son's dreams to join the entertainment industry from the early years, eventually excluding him from his social circle when he did. He has two sons and two daughters

Career 
Khalid Abbas Dar is an entertainer; who performs on radio, television and theater. He is an actor and a mimic. He has worked for over five and a half decades and today Khalid Abbas Dar is recognized as a well-known entertainer in Pakistan.

His career spans from 1958 to date. From his earliest recordings for Radio Pakistan, he then went onto television. Khalid Abbas Dar started his career as a child performer on Radio Pakistan in 1959.

In 2009, Khalid Abbas Dar was associated with Express News for the political satire and one-man comedy show Darling.

Radio 
After he continued his career with Radio Pakistan, Lahore, he was known as a well recognised adult voice in dramas and was associated with the popular radio show named Nizam Din daily for 14 years as an extempore companion and alter ego 'Mehtab Din'.

He was sent by  Radio Pakistan, Lahore to the cities and towns to listen to the people's problems and try to resolve those problems highlighted in his  radio programme.

Performing for Pakistan Armed Forces 
After the ceasefire in the Indo-Pakistani War of 1965, he was asked by the Pakistan Armed Forces authorities, in concert with the All Pakistan Music Conference, to go to the front lines with singers including Mehdi Hassan, Ustad Amanat Ali Khan, Bade Fateh Ali Khan, Masood Rana, Ustad Salamat Ali Khan, Ustad Nazakat Ali Khan, Tufail Niazi, Naseem Begum, Roshan Ara Begum, and Shaukat Ali to entertain the defenders of the country.

Awards and recognition
Pride of Performance Award by the President of Pakistan in 1999.
Sitara-i-Imtiaz (Star of Excellence) Award by the President of Pakistan in 2007.
Hilal-i-Imtiaz (Crescent of Excellence) Award by the President of Pakistan in 2013.
Lifetime achievement award by Radio Pakistan in 2022. 
Roll of Honour  1966 awarded by government college ,Lahore. 
Best Entertainer Award 1987 awarded by PTV.

References

External links 

1942 births
Living people
Punjabi people
Pakistani male comedians
Pakistani male film actors
Pakistani theatre directors
Recipients of the Pride of Performance
Recipients of Sitara-i-Imtiaz
Recipients of Hilal-i-Imtiaz
Central Model School, Lahore alumni
Pakistani people of Kashmiri descent
Pakistani dramatists and playwrights
Pakistani male stage actors
Pakistani male television actors
Male actors from Lahore
Radio personalities from Lahore
People from Lahore